Derwentia is an extinct genus of trematosaurian temnospondyl within the family Rhytidosteidae. It is known from a single skull found from the Knocklofty Sandstone of Tasmania, which is Early Triassic in age.

See also
 Prehistoric amphibian
 List of prehistoric amphibians

References

Stereospondyls
Prehistoric tetrapod genera
Prehistoric vertebrates of Oceania
Triassic temnospondyls of Australia
Fauna of Tasmania
Fossil taxa described in 1974

Paleontology in Tasmania